Ana Ivanovic was the defending champion, but decided to compete at the 2006 Medibank International instead, which was held in the same week.

Spanish player Anabel Medina Garrigues won the title, defeating South Korea's Cho Yoon-jeong in the final in three sets, in the last edition of the tournament.

Seeds

Draw

Finals

Top half

Bottom half

Qualifying

Seeds

Qualifiers

Lucky losers

Qualifying draw

First qualifier

Second qualifier

Third qualifier

Fourth qualifier

External links
Main and Qualifying Draws on ITF

Women's Singles